The Briars is a historic house in Natchez, Mississippi, USA. It was built in 1818 for a large planter. Varina Davis, the First Lady of the Confederate States of America, spent her adolescence in the house. It is listed on the National Register of Historic Places.

History
The land was granted by Spain to Richard Bacon in 1784; it was purchased by Arthur Mahan in 1814.

The house was built in 1818 for Judge John Perkins, a large planter. It was designed by architect Levi Weeks. When his wife died in 1824, Perkins tried to sell the house, but he rented it to William Burr Howell, the son of New Jersey Governor Richard Howell, from 1828 to 1850 instead. Howell's daughter, Varina Howell, grew up at the house as a teenager; she later married Jefferson Davis and served as the First Lady of the Confederacy.

The house was purchased by Walter Irvine in 1853, whose heirs sold it to Emma Augusta Wall in 1927. By the 1970s, it belonged to Robert E. Canon and
Newton Wilds. It was subsequently repurposed as a bed and breakfast.

Heritage significance
The house has been listed on the National Register of Historic Places since August 24, 1977.

References

External links
The Briars

Houses on the National Register of Historic Places in Mississippi
Houses completed in 1818
Houses in Natchez, Mississippi
National Register of Historic Places in Adams County, Mississippi